Malcolm Tucker (born 12 April 1933) is an English former professional footballer who played as a defender. He started his career as an amateur at Newcastle United before going on to play in the Football League for Grimsby Town. He later played non-league football for Skegness Town.

References

External links
Profile at ENFA

1933 births
Living people
People from Cramlington
Footballers from Northumberland
English footballers
Association football defenders
Newcastle United F.C. players
Grimsby Town F.C. players
Skegness Town A.F.C. players
English Football League players